A list of British films released in 2008.

See also
 2008 in film
 2008 in British music
 2008 in British radio
 2008 in British television
 2008 in the United Kingdom
 List of 2008 box office number-one films in the United Kingdom

References

External links

2008
Film
Britain